This article presents the discography of singer, composer, guitar and mandolin player Peter Rowan.

With Earth Opera
 Earth Opera (1968)
 The Great American Eagle Tragedy (1969)

With Seatrain
 Seatrain (1970)
 The Marblehead Messenger (1971)

With Muleskinner
 Muleskinner (1973) (later re-released as A Potpourri of Bluegrass Jam)
 Muleskinner Live: Original Television Soundtrack (1994, recorded 1973)

With Old & In the Way and Old and in the Gray
Old & In the Way (1975, recorded 1973)
That High Lonesome Sound (1996, recorded 1973)
Breakdown (1997, recorded 1973)
Old and in the Gray (2002)
Live at the Boarding House (2008, recorded 1973)
Live at the Boarding House: The Complete Shows (2013, recorded 1973)

As The Rowans, The Rowan Brothers and Peter Rowan & the Rowan Brothers
 The Rowans (1975)
 Sibling Rivalry (1976)
 Jubilation (1977)
 Tree on a Hill (1994)
 Crazy People (2002)

As Peter Rowan & Tony Rice
 You Were There For Me (2004)
 Quartet (2007)

As Rowan & Greene & The Red Hot Pickers
 Bluegrass Album, (1979)
 Hiroshima Mon Amour (1979)
 Peter Rowan with The Red Hot Pickers - compilation (1984)

As Peter Rowan & Flaco Jiménez
 San Antonio Sound (1983)
 Live Rockin' Tex-Mex (1984)

Solo albums and collaborations
 Peter Rowan (1978)
 Texican Badman (1980, recorded 1974/1979)
 Medicine Trail (1980)
 Peter Rowan & the Wild Stallions (1981)
 The Walls of Time (1982)
 Revelry, Peter Rowan, Tex Logan & Greg Douglas (1983)
 The First Whippoorwill (1985)
 Hot Bluegrass, Peter Rowan, Bill Keith, & Jim Rooney (1985)
 New Moon Rising, Peter Rowan & The Nashville Bluegrass Band (1988)
 Dust Bowl Children (1990)
 All on a Rising Day (1991)
 Awake Me in the New World (1993)
 Yonder, Peter Rowan and Jerry Douglas (1996)
 Bluegrass Boy (1996)
 New Freedom Bell, Druhá Tráva and Peter Rowan (1999)
 Reggaebilly (2001)
 High Lonesome Cowboy, Don Edwards and Peter Rowan (2002)
 Live Bannaroo, Peter Rowan & Crucial Reggae - download only (2005)
 Crucial Country: Live At Telluride (2006, recorded 1994)
 Legacy, Peter Rowan Bluegrass Band, (2010)
 The Old School (2013)
 Live at the Boarding House: The Complete Shows (2013, recorded 1973)
 Peter Rowan's Twang an' Groove Vol. 1 (2014) 
 Dharma Blues (2014)
 My Aloha! (2017)
 Carter Stanley's Eyes (2018)

Peter Rowan chronological discography
1968–1970
 Earth Opera (1968)
 The Great American Eagle Tragedy (1969)
 Seatrain (1970)
1971–1980
 The Marblehead Messenger (1971)
 Muleskinner (1973)Old & In the Way (1975, recorded 1973)
 The Rowans (1975)
 Sibling Rivalry (1976)
 Jubilation (1977)
 Peter Rowan (1978)
 Bluegrass Album (1979)
 Hiroshima Mon Amour (1979)
 Texican Badman (1980, recorded 1974/1979)
 Medicine Trail (1980)

1981–1990
 Peter Rowan & the Wild Stallions (1981)
 The Walls of Time (1982)
 San Antonio Sound (1983)
 Revelry, Peter Rowan, Tex Logan & Greg Douglas (1983)
 Live Rockin' Tex-Mex (1984)
 Peter Rowan with The Red Hot Pickers - compilation (1984)
 The First Whippoorwill (1985)
 Hot Bluegrass, Peter Rowan, Bill Keith, & Jim Rooney (1985)
 New Moon Rising, Peter Rowan & The Nashville Bluegrass Band (1988)
 Dust Bowl Children (1990)

1991–2000
 All on a Rising Day (1991)
 Awake Me in the New World (1993)
 Tree on a Hill (1994)
 Yonder, Peter Rowan and Jerry Douglas (1996)
 Bluegrass Boy (1996)That High Lonesome Sound (1996, recorded 1973)Breakdown (1997, recorded 1973)Original Television Soundtrack (1998, recorded 1973)
 New Freedom Bell, Druhá Tráva and Peter Rowan (1999)

2001–2010
 Reggaebilly (2001)
 High Lonesome Cowboy, Don Edwards and Peter Rowan (2002)
 Crazy People (2002)Old and in the Gray (2002)
 You Were There For Me, Peter Rowan & Tony Rice (2004)
 Live Bannaroo, Peter Rowan & Crucial Reggae - download only (2005)
 Crucial Country: Live At Telluride (2006, recorded 1994)
 Quartet, Peter Rowan & Tony Rice (2007)
 Live at the Boarding House (2008, recorded 1973) -- withdrawn by label
 Legacy (2010)

2011–2020
 The Old School (2013)
 Live at the Boarding House: The Complete Shows (2013, recorded 1973)
 Peter Rowan's Twang an' Groove Vol. 1 (2014) 
 Dharma Blues (2014)
 My Aloha! (2017)
 Carter Stanley's Eyes (2018)

2021–2030
 Calling You From My Mountain (2022)

Notes

Country music discographies
Folk music discographies